This is a list of U.S. National Water Ski Championships champions.

Water Ski
Water sports in the United States